Thomas Froud (fl. 1390s) was the member of Parliament for Malmesbury for the parliament of 1395.

References 

Members of the Parliament of England for Malmesbury
English MPs 1395
Year of birth unknown
Year of death unknown